An Ode To Woe is a live album by My Dying Bride. The set contains a live show recorded in Amsterdam on CD and DVD during the band's mini-tour for the album A Line of Deathless Kings. The set marks the second live CD release by the band, and the third on DVD. The show was originally broadcast by website Fabchannel where it is still available for viewing. An Ode To Woe is the first My Dying Bride release to feature Lena Abé on bass and Dan Mullins on drums, as well as the first release not to feature bassist Adrian Jackson since Symphonaire Infernus Et Spera Empyrium.

Track listing
 To Remain Tombless - 7:43
 My Hope, The Destroyer - 5:45
 For You - 6:41
 The Blue Lotus - 6:33
 Like Gods Of The Sun - 5:21
 Catherine Blake - 6:18
 The Cry Of Mankind - 6:07
 The Whore, The Cook And The Mother - 5:42
 Thy Raven Wings - 5:22
 The Snow In My Hand - 7:09
 She Is The Dark - 7:59
 The Dreadful Hours - 12:55
 The Forever People (on DVD only) - 5:28

Credits
 Aaron Stainthorpe - vocals
 Andrew Craighan - guitar
 Hamish Glencross - guitar
 Sarah Stanton- keyboards
 Lena Abé - bass
 Dan Mullins - drums

My Dying Bride live albums
2008 live albums